Steve Hill (born 1957) is a Welsh international lawn bowler and former British champion.

Bowls career
Hill won the Welsh National Bowls Championships singles in 2001  and subsequently won the singles at the British Isles Bowls Championships in 2002.

References

1957 births
Living people
Welsh male bowls players